Franklin Philip Kroehler (February 11, 1897 - December 22, 1974) was an American farmer and politician.

Kroehler was born on a farm near Henderson, Sibley County, Minnesota and went to the Henderson public schools. He lived in Henderson, Minnesota with his wife and family and was a farmer. Kroehler served on the Henderson School Board and was the clerk of the school board. He served in the Minnesota Senate from 1955 to 1966 and was a Republican. Kroehler died at the Community Hospital in Arlington, Minnesota. The funeral and burila took place in Henderson, Minnesota.

References

1897 births
1974 deaths
People from Henderson, Minnesota
Farmers from Minnesota
School board members in Minnesota
Republican Party Minnesota state senators